An electric eel is a freshwater fish of the genus Electrophorus, able to generate powerful electric shocks.

The term may also refer to:

 Electric Eel (roller coaster), a roller coaster at SeaWorld San Diego 
 electric eels, a punk rock band from Cleveland, Ohio active between 1972 and 1975
 Ampaire Electric EEL, a hybrid electric aircraft
 Electric Eel Shock, a Japanese, garage metal band, active since the late 1990s